Easy Come, Easy Go is a 1928 American comedy silent film directed by Frank Tuttle and written by Owen Davis, George Marion Jr. and Florence Ryerson. The film stars Richard Dix, Nancy Carroll, Charles Sellon, Frank Currier, Arnold Kent and Christian J. Frank. The film was released on April 21, 1928, by Paramount Pictures.

Cast 
Richard Dix as Robert Parker
Nancy Carroll as Barbara Quayle
Charles Sellon as Jim Bailey
Frank Currier as Mr. Quayle
Arnold Kent as Winthrop
Christian J. Frank as Detective
Joseph J. Franz as Detective
Guy Oliver	as Conductor

Preservation status
The film is now lost.

References

External links 
 

1928 films
1920s English-language films
Silent American comedy films
1928 comedy films
Paramount Pictures films
Films directed by Frank Tuttle
American black-and-white films
American silent feature films
Lost American films
1928 lost films
Lost comedy films
Films with screenplays by Florence Ryerson
1920s American films